John Walker Hayes (born 1938), mostly known as J.W. Hayes, is a British archaeologist. Hayes studied at the University of Cambridge and was curator at the Royal Ontario Museum in Toronto since 1968. He expertised in Roman pottery, especially Eastern and North-African fine wares. His most famous books are Late Roman Pottery (1972) and Handbook of Mediterranean Roman Pottery (1997). He was distinguished in 1990 with the Gold Medal Award for Distinguished Archaeological Achievement.

References 

Classical archaeologists
Fellows of the Society of Antiquaries of London
1938 births
2019 deaths
Date of birth missing
Date of death missing
Place of birth missing
Place of death missing
Alumni of the University of Cambridge
Royal Ontario Museum
British expatriate academics in Canada
Canadian curators
Scholars of ancient Roman pottery